Zamboanga Sibugay's 1st congressional district is one of the two congressional districts of the Philippines in the province of Zamboanga Sibugay. It has been represented in the House of Representatives since 2007. It was created after the 2006 reapportionment that divided the province into two congressional districts. The district is composed of the eastern municipalities of Alicia, Buug, Diplahan, Imelda, Mabuhay, Malangas, Olutanga, Payao and Talusan. It is currently represented in the 19th Congress by Wilter Palma of the Lakas–CMD.

Representation history

Election results

2019

2016

2013

2010

See also
Legislative districts of Zamboanga Sibugay

References

Congressional districts of the Philippines
Politics of Zamboanga Sibugay
2006 establishments in the Philippines
Congressional districts of Zamboanga Peninsula
Constituencies established in 2006